Édouard Fachleitner (born 24 February 1921 in Santa Domenica d'Albona, Italy, died 18 July 2008) was a French former professional road bicycle racer. He was an Italian citizen until 23 June 1939. He was a professional between 1943 and 1952. Fachleitner's best results were overall victories in the 1948 Critérium du Dauphiné Libéré and 1950 Tour de Romandie and second place overall in the 1947 Tour de France. He also won the one-day races GP d'Armagnac (1945), Ajaccio-Bastia (1946), Ronde d'Aix-en-Provence (1946) and GP de Cannes (1950).

Major results

 1945
 1st, GP d'Armagnac

 1946
 1st, Ajaccio-Bastia
 1st, Ronde d'Aix-en-Provence

 1947
 2nd, Overall, Tour de France
 1st, Stage 11

 1948
 1st, Overall, Critérium du Dauphiné Libéré
 2nd Stage 4a

 1950
 1st, GP de Cannes
 1st, Overall, Tour de Romandie
 3rd, Stage 1b
 3rd, Stage 4

References

External links 

French male cyclists
French Tour de France stage winners
1921 births
2008 deaths
People from Sveta Nedelja, Istria
Italian emigrants to France